Pleurobema rubrum, the pyramid pigtoe, is a species of freshwater mussel, an aquatic bivalve mollusk in the family Unionidae, the river mussels.

This species is endemic to the United States. Its habitat is in medium to large rivers in sand or gravel.

References

Molluscs of the United States
rubrum
Bivalves described in 1820
Taxa named by Constantine Samuel Rafinesque
Taxonomy articles created by Polbot